Yevgeni Viktorovich Zubarev (born 2 February 1967) is a former Russian football player.

References

1967 births
Living people
Soviet footballers
FC Fakel Voronezh players
Russian footballers
Russian Premier League players
Russian expatriate footballers
Expatriate footballers in Ukraine
Association football defenders